Antarctica (1997) is a science fiction novel by American writer Kim Stanley Robinson. It deals with a variety of characters living at or visiting an Antarctic research station. It incorporates many of Robinson's common themes, including scientific process and the importance of environmental protection.

Overview

Most of the story is centred on McMurdo Station, the largest settlement in Antarctica, which is run as a scientific research station by the United States. Robinson's characteristic multiple-protagonist style is employed here to show many aspects of polar life; among the viewpoints presented are those of X, an idealistic young man working as a General Field Assistant at McMurdo; Val, an increasingly embittered trek guide; and Wade Norton, who works for the California Senator Phil Chase (Wade and Phil also appear in the "Science in the Capital" trilogy). As well as McMurdo, the story involves the Amundsen–Scott South Pole Station, the Shackleton Glacier, the McMurdo Dry Valleys and a South American drilling platform near Roberts Massif.

Themes
Antarctica involves many of the ideas Robinson uses elsewhere; as in the Mars trilogy, much emphasis is placed on the importance of living sustainably and the issues of existing in a hostile environment. The significance of Antarctica as a "continent for science" is contrasted with the need to provide a decent environment also for the support staff essential in a place so marginal. Other recurring themes include rock-climbing, physical athleticism, the process and ideology of science, exploitation of natural resources, and the formation of cooperative and anarchic social systems.

The novel was heavily influenced by Robinson's 1995 stay in Antarctica as part of the National Science Foundation's Antarctic Artists and Writers Program, and was nominated for a Locus Award in 1998. While researched in great detail, and generally accurate, some reviews noted that the book was in parts slowed down by heavy amounts of technical and historic detail.

References

External links
Review at CNN

1997 American novels
Novels set in Antarctica
Eco-terrorism in fiction
Novels by Kim Stanley Robinson